Kervin Martin Piñerúa Urbina (22 February 1991 – 18 November 2016) was a Venezuelan volleyball player who played as an opposite hitter for Miranda and as captain for Venezuela's national team. On November 18, 2016 he died at a hospital in Ankara after a heart attack.

Personal life
Piñerúa started playing baseball and competing in athletics at an early age, he was convinced by his mother to play volleyball and entered Venezuela's national team at the age of 18.

Career

2011
Piñerúa represented his country at the First Junior Pan-American Cup in Panama City where he helped his team win the Gold Medal and was named MVP of the competition. He represented his country again in the Pan American Games finishing 8th and the 2011 South American Championship winning the Bronze Medal and the award for "Best Server".

Death

Awards

Individuals
 2010 Junior South American Championship "Best Spiker"
 2011 Junior Pan-American Cup "Most Valuable Player"
 2011 South American Championship "Best Server"
 2016 Lebanese Volleyball Championship "Most Valuable Player" 
 2016 Lebanese Volleyball Championship "Best Opposite"
 2016 Lebanese Volleyball Championship "Best Server"

National Team

Senior Team
 2011 South American Championship -  Gold Medal

Junior Team
 2011 Junior Pan-American Cup -  Gold Medal

References

1991 births
2016 deaths
Venezuelan men's volleyball players
Galatasaray S.K. (men's volleyball) players
21st-century Venezuelan people